Colin B. Begg is a Scottish biostatistician and epidemiologist. He is an attending biostatistician at the Memorial Sloan-Kettering Cancer Center in New York City. He serves as editor-in-chief of the journal Clinical Trials. He has conducted research on the role of BRCA genetic variants in the development of breast cancer, as well as racial disparities in cancer survival rates in the United States.

Begg was named a Fellow of the American Statistical Association in 1996.

References 

Alumni of the University of Glasgow
Biostatisticians
British epidemiologists
Cancer epidemiologists
Living people
Medical journal editors
Memorial Sloan Kettering Cancer Center faculty
Scottish statisticians
Year of birth missing (living people)
Fellows of the American Statistical Association